Anthony (Tony) Freire Marreco (9 August 1915 – 4 June 2006) was a British barrister.  He was Junior Counsel at the Nuremberg trials, and later a founding director of Amnesty International.  He was also known for his romantic liaisons, marrying four times and having numerous other affairs.

Early life
Marreco was the only son of Geoffrey Marreco of St Mawes in Cornwall.  Marreco's family were of Portuguese descent, although his great-grandfather had become a naturalised British subject.  He was educated at Westminster School, where he met Mahatma Gandhi and T. E. Lawrence.  He then attended RADA but was expelled when he missed lessons to attend the Derby.

Career
In the Second World War, Marreco was commissioned in the RNVR in 1940, serving as a Lieutenant Commander in the Fleet Air Arm until 1946.

Marreco was called to the Bar at Inner Temple in 1941.   The Attorney-General, Sir Hartley Shawcross, was a friend of his father, and he invited Marreco to become Junior Counsel in the British Delegation at the International Military Tribunal at Nuremberg, also known as the Nuremberg War Crimes Tribunal, in 1945 and 1946.  He continued to serve as an adviser in post-War Germany, until 1949, but never returned to the bar.

Marreco stood as a Liberal Party candidate for Wells in the 1950 general election. He then stood at Goole in the 1951 general election.  He was later a director of publishing company Weidenfeld and Nicolson and a banker with SG Warburg.  He maintained homes at Porthall, a Georgian house near Lifford in County Donegal where he bred Charollais cattle, and in Shepherd Market in Mayfair in London.  In later years, he retired to Aldbourne in Wiltshire.  Marreco lent his support to Peter Benenson, the son of his neighbour in London, as when Benenson founded Amnesty International in 1960, but resigned as treasurer in 1971 when Amnesty refused to investigate reports of torture by British troops in Northern Ireland.

Personal life
He was married four times, but also had numerous affairs with other women. 
He married Lady Ursula Manners, eldest daughter of the John Manners, 9th Duke of Rutland and Kathleen Tennant, in 1943, but they divorced in 1948. While serving in Germany, he became the lover of Lali Horstmann, then aged 66, the widow of Alfred Horstmann.  He then became involved with Louise de Vilmorin through the late 1940s until 1951.  He reestablished his relationship with Lali Horstmann in 1951, joining her in South America and remaining with her until she died in August 1954, when he inherited part of her fortune.  He later took up with Loelia, Duchess of Westminster.

He married again in 1955, to Brazilian Regina de Souza Coelho, but marriage was dissolved in 1961.  He married for a third time later that year to Anne Wignall (née Acland-Troyte), formerly the wife of Robert Grosvenor, 5th Baron Ebury.  She died in 1982, and he remarried his second wife in 2004.

References

External links
anthonymarreco.com

Alumni of RADA
English barristers
1915 births
2006 deaths
Royal Naval Volunteer Reserve personnel of World War II
S. G. Warburg & Co. people
20th-century English lawyers
Fleet Air Arm personnel of World War II